Kabir is a 2018 Indian Bengali-language action thriller film written and directed by Aniket Chattopadhyay, starring Dev and Rukmini Maitra which released on 13 April 2018.

Plot
The story line of the film is based on apprehension of co-founder of Indian Mujahideen  and conspirator of several bomb blasts in India, Yasin Bhatkal, by National Investigation Agency near Indo-Nepal border.

The story of the film begins with a few bomb blasts in Mumbai.

A burkha clad lady, Yasmin, aged in between 22/23 years, took a taxi from Zaveri Bazaar she was going to VT station. There were ambulances, police vehicles on the way. It was a scary afternoon. The taxi suddenly stopped, it was a comparatively lonely area. The taxi driver refused to give any reason but firmly said that he would not go towards VT. Yasmin was trying to get a lift, but the vehicles didn’t stop. After a few minutes, a car stopped and agreed to give her a lift. The person inside introduced himself as Abir Chatterjee; he was also going to VT station.

On the way to VT, Yasmin had a phone conversation with her father, whom we found to be a half paralysed old man in his Kolkata house. She assured her father, who was watching TV news regarding Bomb blasts in Mumbai. The car reached VT stn, Yasmin got down, thanked Abir. She rushed to the station. Going inside the station, she found that the Duronto Express was late for 2hrs, so she went to the upper class waiting room. Yasmin & Abir met again in the compartment, they both were going to Howrah.

Kabir flirts with Yasmin though she is irritated, shares food with her and then enquires about her. As a matter of courtesy, Yasmin decides to ask more about Abir. Much to her shock, he reveals a live video of her father held hostage and a video of her cousin sister, Ruksana. He threatens to kill them if she doesn't reveal the location of Imtiaz. Her attempts to contact a few friends fail, and she is asked to reveal his location before the train reach Howrah. 

The next day he reveals that he is a jihadi, and a majority of the passengers in their compartment are his aides. He adds that Imtiaz was a jihadi who foiled their attempts back in 2012 by informing the police. They badly want to murder the traitor. This changes Yasmin's attitude which in turn narrates another version of his story according to which it was the owner of the house who betrayed the terrorists; Imtiaz was killed by the special task force, and she herself is a jihadi. Abir, who in the meanwhile has changed his name to Altar Kabir, which he claims to be his original name, refuses to believe her as the photos of those dead jihadis and the rooms in which they lived had a different description from what she told. She is irritated by his behaviour and contacts the Syed, Indian Mujahideen third-in-command and gives information about Kabir through his unique code number (a unique code to identify the jihadis). Parallel to this, a few police officers struggling to decode those codes manage to trace Syed through Yasmin's phone call and arrest him. 

Kabir reveals himself to be a special task officer assigned to bring down the Indian Mujahideen gang. Yasmin says that there is no use of arresting her as the Indian police will be forced to hand over her to their head gang in exchange for a few hostages. Kabir understanding the meaning of her statement, kills her and shoot his hand as if to show that he killed her while trying to defend himself from her.

Cast 
 Dev as  DSP Altaf Kabir Kapoor (STF Officer)/Abir Chatterjee
 Rukmini Maitra as Yasmin Khatun
 Priyanka Sarkar as Damayanti Patekar (STF Officer)
 Shataf Figar as Parvez
 Krishnendu Dewanji as Ashfaq
 Pradip Mukhopadhyay
 Arno Mukhopadhyay as Imtiaz
 Kamaleshwar Mukherjee as Tamal Da
 Ambarish Bhattacharya as Tanmay
 Barun Chanda as Indian Mujahideen third-in-command, Syed Abdul Rahim Tunda
 Srijit Mukherjee (cameo appearance)
 Joy Badlani as local don

Soundtrack

References

External links
 

2018 films
Bengali-language Indian films
2010s Bengali-language films
2018 action thriller films
Indian action thriller films
Films about terrorism in India
Films produced by Dev (Bengali actor)
Films directed by Aniket Chattopadhyay
Films scored by Indradeep Dasgupta